Duke of Ventadour (Fr.: duc de Ventadour) was a noble title in the peerage of France granted to Gilbert de Lévis de Ventadour by Henry IV of France in 1589.  It is named after the Château de Ventadour.

List of Dukes of Ventadour, 1589—1717

The title became extinct in 1717 when Louis Charles de Lévis died without a male heir.

References

French Wikipedia Article

 
1589 establishments in France